Muhamed Hadžijamaković (1814 or 1815 – 25 August 1878) was one of the Bosnian Muslim leaders striving for the Bosnia Vilayet autonomy within the Ottoman Empire in the 1860s and 1870s.

Early life and family
Hadžijamaković was born in Sarajevo into a family of Bosniak Janissary descendants. His father's name was Mehmed, but his mother's name is not known. Hadžijamaković had a brother named Sejfaga and two sisters named Nesiba and Hasiba.

He married twice; the first marriage produced two daughters, Umihana and Fatima. The second marriage produced three sons and a daughter.

Austro-Hungarian Empire
He ardently opposed the Austro-Hungarian occupation of the Bosnia Vilayet in 1878 and eventually became one of the main organizers of the armed resistance in Sarajevo to the invading Austro-Hungarian Army. He was eventually captured and executed by the Austro-Hungarians.

Works
Hadžijamaković wrote a biography of poet Abdulvehab Ilhamija entitled Ilhamija: Život i djelo (Ilhamija: Life and Work).

References

1814 births
1878 deaths
Bosniaks of Bosnia and Herzegovina
Bosnia and Herzegovina Muslims
Bosnia and Herzegovina politicians
Bosnia and Herzegovina writers